Daniela Schächter (born 14 February 1972) is an Italian jazz singer and pianist.

Career
Schächter started on piano when she was eight. In her teens, she performed professionally in Italy and Sicily and worked as a studio musician. In 1998, she attended the Berklee College of Music, where she was taught by Joanne Brackeen. She issued her first album independently in 2001.

Schächter appeared on the radio program Piano Jazz after the host, Marian McPartland, heard she won the Mary Lou Williams jazz piano contest.

Schächter has worked with Patti Austin, Regina Carter, Terri Lyne Carrington, John Dankworth, Shirley Horn, Ingrid Jensen, Christian McBride, Al McKibbon, Tiger Okoshi, Phil Wilson, New York Voices, and the Clayton-Hamilton Jazz Orchestra.

Awards and honors
 Mary Lou Williams Jazz Piano Competition, 2005
 Betty Carter Jazz Ahead Competition, 2002

Discography
 Quintet (2001)
 I Colori Del Mare (Splasc, 2006)
 Purple Butterfly (2009)
 Vanheusenism (2016)

References

External links 
  Official site
 Faculty page at Berklee

1972 births
Living people
Berklee College of Music alumni
Italian jazz singers
Women jazz singers
Italian jazz pianists
Italian women pianists
21st-century Italian women singers
21st-century pianists
21st-century women pianists